Zostera polychlamys is a species of eelgrass native to the shores of South Australia and Western Australia. It was first discovered at Flinders Bay in Western Australia in 1990.

References

polychlamys
Biota of the Indian Ocean
Flora of South Australia
Angiosperms of Western Australia
Plants described in 2005
Salt marsh plants